is a 2013 Japanese film directed by Shūichi Okita. The theme song is called  and is performed by Asian Kung-Fu Generation.

The film was shown at the 13th Japanese Film Festival Nippon Connection in June 2013. It premiered in America on July 13, 2013 at the New York Asian Film Festival and has also made an appearance at the San Diego Asian Film Festival and the Japanese Film Festival in Australia.

Plot 
The story is set in Tokyo in 1987 where Yonosuke Yokomichi has arrived from Nagasaki to study Business Administration at Hosei University. Relative to the other students his suit is crumpled and his hair is uncombed.

He meets Kuramochi, another unconventional student at the introductory meeting, and meets the pretty Yui Akutsu at the formal registration and they agree to explore together rather than be alone.

He encounters Chiharu, a would-be actress in a cafe, and she uses him to extort a car from a businessman. He tells this story to a new friend, Kato, who asks him to join on a double date. His date, Shoko Yosano, the daughter of a rich businessman, arrives in a chauffeur-driven car. They go to a cheap burger cafe but are forced to sit as two pairs. Shoko likes him and tracks him down to ask him to the pool where she introduces him to her half-brother, Katsuhiko, and his rich friends. Here he re-encounters the actress.

Shoko comes to visit him at his parents' house in a coastal village. The next day they go to the beach with friends. While they are having a potentially romantic solitary rendezvous on the beach during the night, their first kiss is disturbed by the arrival of a group of Vietnamese boat people on the beach, and during the confusion a baby is passed to them.

Cast
Kengo Kora as Yonosuke Yokomichi
Yuriko Yoshitaka as Shōko Yosano
Sōsuke Ikematsu as Ippei Kuramochi
Ayumi Itō as Chiharu
Gō Ayano as Katō
Aki Asakura
Keiko Horiuchi as the mother of Shōko
Mei Kurokawa
Noriko Eguchi
Arata Iura
Jun Kunimura as the father of Shōko
Kitarō as the father of Yonosuke
Kimiko Yo as the mother of Yonosuke

Reception
It was chosen as the 3rd best film at the 23rd Japan Film Professional Awards and as the 8th best Japanese film of the year by film magazine Eiga Geijutsu.

References

External links
 

Films directed by Shūichi Okita
2013 films
2010s Japanese films